Francesca Palumbo (born 10 February 1992) is an Italian fencer who won one gold medal at the 2015 Summer Universiade. She also won the bronze medal at 2019 European Fencing Championships.

She competed at the 2022 European Fencing Championships held in Antalya, Turkey.

References

External links

1992 births
Living people
Italian female foil fencers
Universiade medalists in fencing
Universiade gold medalists for Italy
People from Potenza
Medalists at the 2013 Summer Universiade
Medalists at the 2015 Summer Universiade
Medalists at the 2017 Summer Universiade
Sportspeople from the Province of Potenza
21st-century Italian women
World Fencing Championships medalists